The Forest of Éperlecques is a large forest covering some 850 hectares in the commune of Éperlecques in the Pas-de-Calais department in the Nord-Pas-de-Calais region of France. Trails through the forest provide leisure opportunities for walkers. At its south-eastern edge is the Blockhaus d'Éperlecques, a museum preserving the Second World War Kraftwerk Nord West bunker built by the Germans as a launch site for V-2 rockets.

References

Forests of France
Geography of the Pas-de-Calais
Tourist attractions in Pas-de-Calais